Isa Hassan Jama'are is a Nigerian politician, a member of House of Representatives from Jama'are/Itas-Gadau federal constituency, Bauchi State. He was re-elected for the third term on 28 March 2015.

References

External links
 https://web.archive.org/web/20180410072602/http://www.nass.gov.ng/mp/profile/899
 https://web.archive.org/web/20180410072411/http://www.nigerianbiography.com/2015/12/biography-of-isa-hassan-mohammed.html

Year of birth missing (living people)
Living people
21st-century Nigerian politicians
People from Bauchi State